A thunder sheet is a thin sheet of metal used to produce sound effects for musical or dramatic events. The device may be shaken, causing it to vibrate, or struck with a mallet. It is also known as a thunder machine, though this can also refer to a large drum used for a similar sound effect.

Thunder sheets are available from some cymbal makers including Paiste and Sabian, or can easily be made out of any scrap metal sheet. The thinner and larger the sheet, the louder the sound. The thunder sheet needs to be "warmed up" before the actual sound is desired to be heard. The player(s) will need to start slowly shaking the sheet a few seconds before quickly shaking the sheet.

Usage
Dramatist John Dennis devised the thunder sheet as a new method of producing theatrical thunder for his 1709 tragedy Appius and Virginia at the Theatre Royal, Drury Lane, London. His invention was stolen by another theater play, and that gave rise to the phrase: "stole my thunder".

Notable orchestral works in which the instrument has been used include the following: 
Richard Strauss: Eine Alpensinfonie and the opera Die Frau ohne Schatten
Giuseppe Verdi: Otello
Richard Wagner: Der Ring des Nibelungen and Parsifal.
Mozart: The Magic Flute 
Ignacy Jan Paderewski: Symphony in B minor "Polonia" (1903–08)
Alan Hovhaness: "Invocation to Vahakn No. 3"
Engelbert Humperdinck: Hänsel und Gretel
The American rock band The Grateful Dead also used thunder machines.

Theatre
Simpler machines were employed in the theatre, such as rolling a ball down a trough striking wooden cleats.

See also 
 Bell plate
 Gong
 Wobble board
Castle thunder

References

External links
"Thunder machine, thunder sheet", OxfordIndex.oup.com.

Percussion idiophones
Shaken idiophones or rattles
Hand percussion
Musical instruments played with soft mallets
Orchestral percussion instruments
Unpitched percussion instruments